Benediktas is a Lithuanian masculine given name, derived from the Latin name "Benedictus", which itself is derived from the Latin compound bene ('good') and dicte ('speak'), i.e. "well spoken". Individuals bearing the name Benediktas include:

Benediktas Mikulis (1920–2000), Lithuanian partisan
Benediktas Vilmantas Rupeika (born 1944), Lithuanian politician
Benediktas Vanagas (born 1977), Lithuanian rally driver

References

Masculine given names
Lithuanian masculine given names